
Fort Augusta Adult Correctional Centre, formerly Fort Augusta Prison, is Jamaica's only prison for women. It was built to accommodate 250 female inmates but has held over 280 on occasions. It has been known to run short of food.

It is operated by the Department of Correctional Services for the Ministry of National Security.

Fort Augusta was originally an ocean side fortress built by the English in the 1740s to provide the main defence for Kingston Harbour’s west side. It was completed in the 1750s and named Fort Augusta in honour of the mother of King George III. In 1763 lightning struck the fort and its three thousand barrels of gunpowder causing an explosion that broke windows 17 miles away and killed three hundred people. The shocks created a crater which had to be filled before reconstruction could begin.  During the American Revolution the fort was occupied by the Duke of Cumberland's Regiment.

The remains of the fortress now consists of massive crumbling walls of brick that have been fortified with other materials (including barbed wire).

Some years ago, the DCS sold the land on which Fort Augusta sits to the Port Authority of Jamaica. At the time, the DCS had plans to build a 5000 inmate prison that would accommodate both males and females and relieve the overcrowding faced by most prisons in Jamaica. However, while the new facility is long in coming a move is still anticipated so no one is willing to do any renovations to Fort Augusta.

On March 2, 2017 Fort Augusta inmates were relocated to the south camp rehabilitation center.

In April 2020 it was announced that the Jamaican government intends to use Fort Augusta as a half way house and counselling center for returning deportees.

See also
List of prisons in Jamaica

External links
Aerial view.
Photos:

References

Prisons in Jamaica
Women's prisons in Jamaica
Buildings and structures in Saint Catherine Parish